This list is for recognised pioneering explorers of the polar regions. It does not include subsequent travelers and expeditions.

Polar explorers

 Jameson Adams
 Stian Aker
 Valerian Albanov
 Roald Amundsen
 Salomon August Andrée
 Piotr Fyodorovich Anjou
 Henryk Arctowski
 Josée Auclair
 Mikhail Babushkin
 Konstantin Badygin
 Karl Baer
 Georgiy Baidukov
 Ann Bancroft
 Willem Barents
 Michael Barne
 Robert Bartlett
 Nikifor Begichev
 Fabian von Bellingshausen
 Robert M. Berry
 Edward W. Bingham
 Olav Bjaaland
 Alfred Björling
 Carsten Borchgrevink
 Jon Bowermaster
 Henry Robertson Bowers
 Louise Arner Boyd
 Edward Bransfield
 Philip Brocklehurst
 William Speirs Bruce
 Georgy Brusilov
 Daniel Byles
 Richard Evelyn Byrd
 Todd Carmichael
 Umberto Cagni
 Jacques Cartier
 Jean-Baptiste Charcot
 Semion Chelyuskin
 Apsley Cherry-Garrard
 Vasili Chichagov
 Valery Chkalov
 Jeremy Clarkson
 George Comer
 Sebastian Copeland
 Frederick A. Cook
 James Cook
 Henry Cookson
 Augustine Courtauld
 Albert P. Crary
 Tom Crean
 Lars Christensen
 Andrew Croft
 Francis Crozier
 Ann Daniels
 Edgeworth David
 Jason De Carteret
 Edwin de Haven
 George W. De Long
 Nina Demme
 Antoni Bolesław Dobrowolski
 Erich von Drygalski
 George J. Dufek
 Jules Dumont d'Urville
 Lincoln Ellsworth
 Edward Evans
 Edgar Evans
 Sir Ranulph Fiennes
 Dwayne Fields
 John Franklin
 Peter Freuchen
 Martin Frobisher
 Vivian Fuchs
 Tobias Furneaux
 Yakov Gakkel
 Matvei Gedenschtrom
 Adrien de Gerlache
 Johann Georg Gmelin
 Adolphus Greely
 Pen Hadow
 Charles Francis Hall
 Helmer Hanssen
 Bernhard Hantzsch
 Sverre Hassel
 Adrian Hayes
 Isaac Israel Hayes
 Samuel Hearne
 Matthew A. Henson
 Wally Herbert
 Alex Hibbert
 Edmund Hillary
 John Hornby
 Andreas Hovgaard
 Henry Hudson
 Edward Israel
 Hjalmar Johansen
 Antony Jinman
 Erling Kagge
 Otto Kalvitsa
 Elisha Kent Kane
 Sydney L. Kirkby
 Gerald Ketchum
 Maria Klenova
 Lauge Koch
 Aleksandr Kolchak
 Nikolai Kolomeitsev
 Alexander Kuchin
 Paul Landry
 Dmitry Laptev
 Khariton Laptev
 Carl Anton Larsen
 Georges Lecointe
 Christian Leden
 Ernest de Koven Leffingwell
 Percy Lemon
 Godske Lindenov
 Martin Lindsay
 Fyodor Litke
 Ivan Lyakhov
 Alistair Mackay
 Alexander MacKenzie
 Aeneas Mackintosh
 Cecil Madigan
 Rune Malterud
 Stepan Malygin
 Donal T. Manahan
 Albert Hastings Markham
 James Marr
 Eric Marshall
 Fyodor Matisen
 Fyodor Matyushkin
 Douglas Mawson
 James May
 Francis Leopold McClintock
 Jim McNeill
 Janice Meek
 Alexander Middendorf
 Ejnar Mikkelsen
 Fyodor Minin
 Gerhard Muller
 Fridtjof Nansen
 George Nares
 Alfred Gabriel Nathorst
 Edward Nelson
 Umberto Nobile
 Adolf Erik Nordenskiöld
 Otto Nordenskjöld
 Børge Ousland
 Dmitry Ovtsyn
 Pyotr Pakhtusov
 Nathaniel Palmer
 Ivan Papanin
 William Parry
 Charlie Paton
 Fiann Paul
 Robert Edwin Peary
 Yakov Permyakov
 Eric Philips
 Ralph Plaisted
 Fedot Popov
 Richard Profit
 Vasili Pronchishchev
 Maria Pronchishcheva
 Lewis Gordon Pugh
 Emil Racovita
 Pierre-Esprit Radisson
 John Rae
 Knud Rasmussen
 Andrew Regan
 George W. Rice
 John Richardson
 Hjalmar Riiser-Larsen
 Quintin Riley
 Alfred Ritscher
 Edith Ronne
 Finn Ronne
 James Clark Ross
 John Ross
 Vladimir Rusanov
 John Rymill
 Rudolf Samoylovich
 Yakov Sannikov
 Ben Saunders
 Otto Schmidt
 William Scoresby
 Robert Falcon Scott
 Georgy Sedov
 Ernest Shackleton
 Nobu Shirase
 Pyotr Shirshov
 Paul Siple
 Mikhail Somov
 Pavel Senko
 Mikhail Stadukhin
 Vilhjalmur Stefansson
 Will Steger
 Otto Sverdrup
 Robert Swan
 Eduard Toll
 Yevgeny Tolstikov
 Alexey Tryoshnikov
 Avgust Tsivolko
 Nikolay Urvantsev
 Georgy Ushakov
 Merkury Vagin
 Boris Vilkitsky
 Vladimir Vize
 Lawrence Wager
 Paul Walker
 Carl Frederick Wandel
 Gino Watkins
 Richard Weber
 James Weddell
 Walter Wellman
 Frank Wild
 Hubert Wilkins
 Edward Wilson
 Oscar Wisting
 Frank Worsley
 Ferdinand von Wrangel

See also
 List of Russian explorers
 List of female explorers and travelers

References

 
 
 
History-related lists
Geography-related lists
Antarctica-related lists